"Mr. Mysterious" is a song by Australian recording artist Vanessa Amorosi feating Seany B, who is best known for being the performer of the TV Rock hit "Flaunt It". "Mr. Mysterious" was released in April 2010 as the third single from Amorosi's fourth studio album Hazardous.

Amorosi describes the song as "a cheeky track about the guy you know nothing about but you can't get out of your head".

Before release as a digital single, the song was being used in the ads by the Network Ten for the British television drama series Merlin.

Promotion
"Mr. Mysterious" was first performed live on TV at the 2009 Perth Telethon on 3 October 2009. Amorosi filmed the video for "Mr. Mysterious" in February 2010.

In 2010, Amorosi performed "Mr.Mysterious" on Hey Hey It's Saturday.

Music video
The video clip for "Mr. Mysterious" was shot in February by director Stuart Gosling.
Gosling's Motion Cubism FX is used intensively throughout the video creating a fluid and mesmerising visual performance. Digital Pictures spent three weeks of post production to get the FX right.
The video premiered on The Today Show and on Mornings with Kerri-Anne on 26 March 2010.

Track listing
Music download
Preorder 'Single'
"Mr. Mysterious" (Single version)
"Mr. Mysterious" (Dance Dude Macho Club Mix)

GetMusic
"Mr. Mysterious" (Single version)
"This Is Who I Am" (The Lonewolf version)

iTunes
"Mr. Mysterious" (feat. Seany B) — 3:45
"Hazardous" (Kill Bill version)— 5:14

Charts

Weekly charts

Year-end chart

Certifications

Release history

References

2010 singles
Vanessa Amorosi songs
Songs written by Vanessa Amorosi
Song recordings produced by MachoPsycho
2009 songs
Universal Music Group singles
Music videos directed by Stuart Gosling